Tor «Jern-Gustav» Gundersen (September 15, 1935 – September 13, 2012) was a Norwegian ice hockey player. He played for the Norwegian national ice hockey team, and  participated at the Winter Olympics in 1964 and in 1968. He was awarded Gullpucken as best Norwegian ice hockey player in 1960. He was a playing head coach for Vålerenga Ishockey during the team's golden age in the 1960s and has ten championships in his name.

References

External links
Tor Gundersen's obituary 

1935 births
2012 deaths
Ice hockey players at the 1964 Winter Olympics
Ice hockey players at the 1968 Winter Olympics
Norwegian ice hockey players
Olympic ice hockey players of Norway
Ice hockey people from Oslo